Charles Denis Sauter Bourbaki (22 April 1816, Pau – 22 September 1897, Bayonne) was a French general.

Career
Bourbaki was born at Pau, the son of Greek colonel Constantin Denis Bourbaki, who died in the War of Independence in 1827. He was educated at the Prytanée National Militaire, entered St Cyr, and in 1836 joined the Zouaves, becoming lieutenant of the Foreign Legion in 1838 and aide-de-camp to King Louis Philippe.

Early commands 
It was in the African expedition that Bourbaki first came to the front. In 1842 he was captain in the Zouaves; 1847, colonel of the Turcos; in 1850, lieutenant-colonel of the 1st Zouaves; 1851, colonel; 1854, brigadier-general. In the Crimean War he commanded a portion of the Algerian troops; and at the Alma, Inkerman and Sevastopol Bourbaki's name became famous. 

In 1857 he was made general of division, commanding in 1859 at Lyon. His success in the war in Italy was second only to that of MacMahon, and in 1862 he was proposed as a candidate for the vacant Greek throne, but declined the proffered honour.

Imperial Guard 
In 1870 the Emperor Napoleon III entrusted Bourbaki with the command of the Imperial Guard, and he played an important part in the fighting round Metz. His conduct at Gravelotte however was questionable as with the Prussians exhausted from the fighting and heavy casualties, the French were poised to mount a counter-attack but for Bourbaki refusing to commit the reserves of the French Imperial Guard to the battle because he considered it a defeat.

A curious incident of the siege of Metz, during the Franco-Prussian War, is connected with Bourbaki's name. A certain Edmond Régnier, a French businessman with no political background or connections, appeared at Hastings the 21 September to seek an interview with the refugee empress Eugénie, and failing to obtain this he managed to get from the young Prince Imperial a signed photograph with a message to the emperor Napoleon. This he used, by means of a safe-conduct from Bismarck, as credentials to Marshal Bazaine, to whom he presented himself at Metz, telling him on the empress's alleged authority that peace was about to be signed and that either Marshal Canrobert or General Bourbaki was to go to Hastings for the purpose. 

Bourbaki at once went to England, with Prussian connivance, as though he had a recognized mission, only to discover from the empress at Hastings that a trick had been played on him. As soon as he could manage he returned to France but was refused re-entrance into Metz on a technicality, because his Prussian-provided passport was outdated by a few days.

Armée de l'Est 

Bourbaki offered his services to Gambetta and received the command of the Northern Army, but was recalled on 10 November and transferred to the Army of the Loire. In command of the hastily trained and ill-equipped Army of the East, Bourbaki made the attempt to raise the siege of Belfort, which, after the victory of Villersexel, ended in the repulse of the French in the three days' battle of the Lisaine. 

Other German forces under Manteuffel now closed upon Bourbaki, and he was eventually driven over the Swiss frontier with the remnant of his forces. His troops were in the most desperate condition, owing to lack of food; and out of 150,000 men under him when he started, only 87,000 men with 12,000 horses escaped into Swiss territory. They crossed the western border of Switzerland at Les Verrières, Sainte-Croix, Vallorbe and in the Vallée de Joux at the beginning of February 1871. They were disarmed and detained for six weeks before being repatriated in March. This event is memorialized in the Bourbaki Panorama in Switzerland.

Rather than submit to the humiliation of a probable surrender, Bourbaki had delegated his functions to General Clinchant on 26 January 1871 and tried to commit suicide that night. He fired a pistol at his own forehead, but the bullet somehow "flattened as if against a cast-iron plate" and his life was saved. General Clinchant carried Bourbaki into Switzerland, where he recovered sufficiently to return to France.

In July 1871, he again took the command at Lyon and subsequently became military governor.

Later service 
In 1881, owing to his political opinions, he was placed on the retired list. In 1885 he was an unsuccessful candidate for the senate. 

A patriotic Frenchman and a brilliant soldier and leader, Bourbaki, like some other French generals of the Second Empire whose training had been obtained in Africa, was found wanting in the higher elements of command when the European conditions of 1870 were concerned.

Cultural references
A group of 20th-century French mathematicians published many works under the pseudonym Nicolas Bourbaki, possibly named after the general.

The scene of Bourbaki's army being disarmed when they crossed the Swiss borders is the subject of a panoramic painting, the Bourbaki Panorama, done in 1881 by Edouard Castres. Since 1889, this 360° painting has been on display in Lucerne, Switzerland.

Notes

References

1816 births
1897 deaths
People from Pau, Pyrénées-Atlantiques
French generals
French people of Greek descent
French military personnel of the Crimean War
French military personnel of the Franco-Prussian War
Officers of the French Foreign Legion
Grand Croix of the Légion d'honneur